In information technology, a Christmas tree packet is a packet with every single option set for whatever protocol is in use.

Background
The term derives from a fanciful image of each little option bit in a header being represented by a different-colored light bulb, all turned on, as in "the packet was lit up like a Christmas tree".  It can also be known as a kamikaze packet, nastygram, or lamp test segment. 

Christmas tree packets can be used as a method of TCP/IP stack fingerprinting, exposing the underlying nature of a TCP/IP stack by sending the packets and then awaiting and analyzing the responses. When used as part of scanning a system, the TCP header of a Christmas tree packet has the flags FIN, URG and PSH set. Many operating systems implement their compliance with the Internet Protocol standards in varying or incomplete ways.  By observing how a host responds to an odd packet, such as a Christmas tree packet, inferences can be made regarding the host's operating system.  Versions of Microsoft Windows, BSD/OS, HP-UX, Cisco IOS, MVS, and IRIX display behaviors that differ from the RFC standard when queried with said packets.

A large number of Christmas tree packets can also be used to conduct a DoS attack by exploiting the fact that Christmas tree packets require much more processing by routers and end-hosts than the "usual" packets do.

Christmas tree packets can be easily detected by intrusion-detection systems or more advanced firewalls. From a network security point of view, Christmas tree packets are always suspicious and indicate a high probability of network reconnaissance activities.

See also 
Martian packet

References

External links
Nmap documentation

Computer jargon
Packets (information technology)
Denial-of-service attacks